WLBJ was the first commercial radio station in Bowling Green, Kentucky, signing-on in June 1940.  The station operated at 1410 kilohertz for much of its existence.  Among the more significant local programs it produced were the 4 O'Clock Special, hosted by disc jockeys G. W. Boyum in 1947 and Brad Taylor in 1950, The Smilemaker, a morning and afternoon drive program featuring cuts from comedy albums by popular comedians, and Opinion Line, an Associated Press award-winning local public affairs program hosted by newscaster Mike Green in the 1980s.

History
WLBJ began broadcasting on June 25, 1940, under ownership of Bowling Green Broadcasting Company. The callsign stood for its founder L.B. Jenkins who put the station on the air. it originally operated at a frequency of 1340 kilocycles. The station originally broadcast at a power of 250 watts during the first years on the 

In its early days, the station's studios were located at the intersection of Fairview Avenue and Lehman Avenue in Bowling Green, and would later relocate both the studios and transmitter to its final location of 689 Scott Lane, in what is now known as Indian Ridge Subdivision, adjacent to the present-day Indian Hills Country Club. 

In 1950, WLBJ moved its signal to its final frequency at 1410 kilocycles. The station was purchased by Bahakel Communications of Charlotte, North Carolina, in 1955, with the new owner taking control of the station on January 1, 1956.

From its beginning, and even into its later years, the station was well known as a favorite among country music fans in south-central Kentucky and northern middle Tennessee By the 1960s, it had an effective daytime power of 5,000 watts (1,000 watts directional at night). One of the station's most popular programs later in the station's life was the 1981 launch of the Wrangler Country Showdown, a live-broadcast country music talent search which preceded such current programs as American Idol by some 20 years.

The station was also known as one of the earliest and longest-running affiliates of the now-defunct Mutual Broadcasting System and also carried Mutual's The Larry King Show, which was broadcast overnight during the early 1980s, making the station Bowling Green's first 24-hour radio operation.

The station was an affiliate of Cincinnati Reds baseball and the University of Kentucky football/basketball networks.  The station was also known for live broadcasts of horse racing events at Keeneland Race Course in Lexington. The station also broadcast national news updates from The Christian Science Monitor news service during the 1980s.

The station also became well known for using their cowboy "boot" (Kentucky Kountry King) logo and 30-second jingle in the station's television advertisements which aired on ABC television affiliate WBKO. In return, 30-second spots advertising WBKO's evening news stories were aired over the radio station.

During the 1970s and early 1980s, the call letters were also assigned to sister station WLBJ-FM, operating at 96.7 megahertz under the brands "Natural 97" (Album-Oriented Rock) under the program direction lead of Jay Preston, Greg Pogue, and later Dean Warfield, and later an automated "BJ 97" (Adult Contemporary). The call letters of the FM station were changed in the mid-1980s to WCBZ. Today, the 96.7 frequency is owned and operated by Bowling Green-based country music station, WBVR-FM. WLBJ permanently signed off the air on December 6, 1991.

In recent years, the iconic call letters were reassigned to an AM station operating at 1570 kilohertz in the Louisville suburb of New Albany, Indiana.  That station has since changed its call letters.

The callsign also existed on a now-defunct low-power FM station (WLBJ-LP) in Fostoria, Ohio.

References
 Sies, Luther F. Encyclopedia of American Radio 1920-1960. Jefferson, NC:McFarland, 2000.

Other references

Defunct radio stations in the United States
LBJ
Radio stations established in 1940
Radio stations disestablished in 1991
1940 establishments in Kentucky
1993 disestablishments in Kentucky
LBJ